The National University of Science and Technology (MISiS) is a public technological university in the field of steelmaking and metallurgy, based in Moscow, Russia. It was established in 1918 as a part of the Moscow Mining Academy. In 1930, it became independent. During Stalin's regime, the institute was renamed as Stalin Moscow Institute of Steel. It adopted the name Moscow Institute of Steel and Alloys in 1962 after uniting with the Institute of Nonferrous Metals and Gold. The status of technological university was awarded in 1993 and the status of a National University in 2008, when the institution adopted its current name.

MISIS is a university of the Higher Metallurgical Education Association, whose members include universities from Russia, Ukraine, and Kazakhstan. It has joint degree programmes with the Freiberg University of Mining and Technology in Freiberg, Germany, and the Institut National Polytechnique de Lorraine in Nancy, France.

Institutes 
 Institute of Metallurgy, Ecology and Quality
 Institute of Physical Chemistry of Materials
 Institute of Materials Technology
 Institute of Mining
 Institute of Computer Science and Economics
 Institute of Humanities
 Institute of Information Business Systems
 Faculty of Part-Time Education
 Post Higher Education Centre
 Preparatory Faculty
 Mining

Notable alumni
Viktor Berkovsky, Soviet and Ukrainian bard
Mikhail Fridman, Ukrainian-born Russian–Israeli businessman, billionaire, and oligarch
German Khan, Ukrainian-Russian businessman, billionaire, and oligarch
Eduard Shifrin, Ukrainian entrepreneur and co-owner of the Midland Group 

MISIS has about 16,500 undergraduate, graduate, and doctoral students, and a faculty of about 1200, including 326 professors and 350 associate professors.

References

External links 

 Moscow Institute of Steel and Alloys (Russian / English)
 "Tsvetnye Metally" metallurgical journal, supported by Moscow Institute of Steel and Alloys

National University of Science and Technology MISiS
National research universities in Russia
Universities in Moscow
1918 establishments in Russia
Educational institutions established in 1918
Universities and institutes established in the Soviet Union